Danutė Jočienė (maiden name Sadauskaitė, born November 10, 1970 in Tučiai, Mažeikiai, Lithuania) is a Lithuanian lawyer.

Jočienė graduated from the Law Faculty of Vilnius University and worked as a lecturer in the Department of the International and European Union Law of the Faculty.

She was agent of the Lithuanian government for the European Court of Human Rights from 2003 to November 2004.

Jočienė's professional work has been in the field of human rights law, and she was appointed as a judge and reporter from Lithuania to the second section of the European Court of Human Rights in 2004. She was member of this court up until 2013.

In 2014, Jočienė was appointed to the Constitutional Court of the Republic of Lithuania. In 2021, she was appointed to the Court's chairman position and thus, Jočienė became first chairwoman to lead the Constitutional Court.

See also
Law of Lithuania
Vilenas Vadapalas
Pranas Kūris

References

Sources 
Danutė Jočienė, MK (LT)

Judges of the European Court of Human Rights
Lithuanian judges
International law scholars
1970 births
Living people
Lithuanian legal scholars
Vilnius University alumni
Academic staff of Vilnius University
Lithuanian judges of international courts and tribunals